Roger W. Strickland (September 4, 1940 – February 2, 2011), nicknamed "The Rifle", was an American basketball forward. He played college basketball for Jacksonville University and professional basketball for the Baltimore Bullets of the National Basketball Association (NBA).

Early years
Strickland was born in 1940 in Jacksonville, Florida. He attended Bishop Kenny High School where he was a standout baseball and basketball player.

College career
After attending Notre Dame for a year, Strickland transferred to Jacksonville University where he continued to excel in baseball and basketball. He was selected by the Associated Press (AP) to the 1962 and 1963 college basketball Little All-America teams. He averaged 27 points per game at Jacksonville. He was also selected in 1962 and 1963 to the UPI's small college All-America basketball team. 

Strickland also played baseball as a pitcher and outfielder at Jacksonville. In 1963 he was named the most valuable baseball player in the Florida Intercollegiate Conference. He was also selected as a second-team outfielder on the NAIA's 1963 All-America baseball team.

Professional basketball
Strickland was taken with the eighth overall pick by the Los Angeles Lakers in the 1963 NBA draft; previously, in 1962, he was also drafted by the Boston Celtics. He signed with the Lakers in June 1963.

On September 25, 1963, the Lakers requested waivers on Strickland. On October 1, 1963, he was claimed off waivers by the Baltimore Bullets. He appeared in one game for the Bullets where he scored two points going 1-3 from the field.

Later years
Strickland continued to play amateur basketball and was a member of the 1969 Samoa Lounge Headhunters club that competed for the national A.A.U. championship. He also became an executive with Southern Bell.

Strickland died in 2011 at age 70.

References

1940 births
2011 deaths
American men's basketball players
Baltimore Bullets (1963–1973) players
Basketball players from Jacksonville, Florida
Bishop Kenny High School alumni
Boston Celtics draft picks
Deaths from cancer in Florida
Forwards (basketball)
Jacksonville Dolphins men's basketball players
Los Angeles Lakers draft picks
University of Notre Dame alumni